Sir John Herbert Parsons CBE FRS FRCS (3 September 1863, Bristol – 7 October 1957, University College Hospital, London) was a British ophthalmologist and ophthalmic surgeon.

Education
Parsons was educated at the University of Bristol, University College London, and at St Bartholomew's Hospital. He received in 1890 his BSc in physiology, in 1891 his MRCS, and in 1892 his MB.

Career and research
He was appointed an assistant in the Department of Physiology at University College London and practised medicine for several years in Finchley. He then became a clinical assistant at Moorfields Eye Hospital. In 1900 he received the MB London and the FRCS England. At Moorfields, he was promoted from clinical assistant and became, successively, curator and librarian and was then elected to the surgical staff in 1904. He became an ophthalmic surgeon at University College Hospital and continued as a surgeon there and at Moorfields until his retirement. He was also an ophthalmic surgeon for some years at the Hospital for Sick Children, Great Ormond Street. In ophthalmic pathology he became a world authority and produced numerous research articles and several books on eye diseases, ophthalmic optics. and ophthalmic circulation.

Parsons served on various government committees dealing with vision tests, blindness prevention, and proper lighting in factories. During World War I he was a consultant ophthalmological surgeon with the rank of Colonel, Army Medical Service, for which he was awarded Commander of the Order of the British Empire (CBE) in the 1919 Birthday Honours. From 1928 to 1932 he was a member of the Medical Research Council.

Honours and awards
1904 and 1914 — Middlemore Prize
1907 — Nettleship Gold Medal
1919 — Doyne Medal from Oxford
1919 — C.B.E.
1921 — Fellow of the Royal Society
1922 — Knighthood 
1925 — Bowman Lectureship
1929 — honoured guest at the opening of the Wilmer Eye Institute in the United States
1936 — Howe Medal of the American Academy of Ophthalmology and Otolaryngology
1936–1938 — President of the Royal Society of Medicine

Selected works

 (Volumes 1 to 4, published from 1904 to 1908)

References

1863 births
1957 deaths
Alumni of the University of Bristol
Alumni of University College London
20th-century English medical doctors
British ophthalmologists
Royal Army Medical Corps officers
Commanders of the Order of the British Empire
Fellows of the Royal Society
Presidents of the Royal Society of Medicine
Knights Bachelor
Physicians of Great Ormond Street Hospital
British Army personnel of World War I